Mannheim Steamroller is an American neoclassical new-age music ensemble founded and directed by percussionist/composer Chip Davis in 1974. The group is known primarily for its Fresh Aire series of albums, which blend classical music with elements of new age and rock, and for its modern recordings of Christmas music. The group has sold 28 million albums in the U.S. alone.

History

Beginnings
Mannheim Steamroller began as an alias for record producer and composer Chip Davis. The name "Mannheim Steamroller" comes from an 18th-century German musical technique, Mannheim roller (German: Mannheimer Walze), a crescendo passage having a rising melodic line over an ostinato bass line, popularized by the Mannheim school of composition.

Before the fame of Steamroller, Davis had been best known for collaborating with his friend Bill Fries on the songs of the country music character "C. W. McCall", of "Convoy" fame. The song was based on the character created by Fries and music composed by Davis for a series of Clio winning ads for Metz Baking Company for their Old Home Bread product. Davis was named Country Music Writer of the Year in 1976, a genre he is not fond of.

Even before the height of McCall's popularity, Davis produced an unusual album of classical music performed entirely by Davis and musical collaborator and keyboardist Jackson Berkey, using electric bass (played by Eric Hansen) and synthesizers.

Fresh Aire and American Gramaphone
Since no major label would handle the distribution of Fresh Aire, Davis founded his own music label, American Gramaphone (a play on the classical record label Deutsche Grammophon), to release the album, which was published in 1975 under the pseudonym Mannheim Steamroller. Fresh Aire II was subsequently released in 1977, and Fresh Aire III was released in 1979. The first four Fresh Aire albums constituted an exploration of the four seasons, with Fresh Aire being spring, Fresh Aire II being fall, Fresh Aire III being summer, and Fresh Aire IV being winter. All four of these albums maintained the blend of baroque classical music, light jazz, and rock and featured Jackson Berkey's virtuosic keyboard work. Davis and Berkey used whatever instrument seemed appropriate to the piece, using a toy piano on one piece and a full pipe organ on another, with copious interleaving of piano and harpsichord. In 1981 Davis released Fresh Aire Interludes, an album that compiled Berkey's ten piano interludes from the first four Fresh Aire albums.

Davis then moved into exploring some other themes, with Fresh Aire V subtitled "To the Moon," Fresh Aire VI exploring Greek mythology, Fresh Aire 7 based on the number 7, and Fresh Aire 8 based on the theme of infinity. A live tour of the early albums featured a prominent light show and multimedia components, along with spoken poetry by Almeda Berkey. While the music was slightly different from the album versions, it was played in lockstep at each show, as it had to coordinate the live musicians with recorded tracks of strings and other orchestral parts.

In 1986, Mannheim Steamroller released music composed for a PBS special called Saving the Wildlife, which featured one track from Fresh Aire VI and twelve new tracks. In 1987, Davis collaborated with guitarist/composer Mason Williams for the album Classical Gas. The music was composed entirely by Williams but produced and arranged by Davis. The album opens with a remake of Williams' 1968 instrumental "Classical Gas", which used the original arrangement.

Christmas music success
Steamroller found its greatest fame beginning in 1984 when Davis released his first holiday album, Mannheim Steamroller Christmas, featuring modern contemporary interpretations of Yuletide favorites. This was followed by A Fresh Aire Christmas (1988) and Christmas in the Aire (1995), which showcased creative approaches to old carols, as well as some new carol-like compositions. Steamroller had now become one of the most requested Christmas music artists of all time, in part by adopting a very radio-friendly approach. At the end of 1997, they released a live album of Christmas music, Mannheim Steamroller Christmas Live. Their fourth all-new Christmas album, Christmas Extraordinaire, was released in 2001. However, sales of Steamroller's third and fourth Christmas releases fell far short of the sales of Christmas and A Fresh Aire Christmas. Christmas Celebration, a compilation of favorite tracks from the previous studio albums (with one new song), was released in 2004. The studio album Christmas Song was released in late 2007 and features guest vocals by Johnny Mathis and Olivia Newton-John, but co-founder Jackson Berkey is absent from the lineup.  The CD Christmasville was released in 2008.  Their next release was a 25th anniversary Christmas box set consisting of previously released material, and in 2011 they released Mannheim Steamroller Christmas Symphony with members of the Czech Philharmonic Orchestra.

Other work
Musically, as the 1990s progressed, Davis moved into the mainstream of "progressive rock" music with a heavier reliance on synthesized instruments and less humor. Titles like "Small Wooden Bach'ses" from Fresh Aire III were not seen, nor mechanisms like the creative use of a cricket on the same album or the Gregorian chant on Fresh Aire II. Davis's music became closer to the "light jazz" style that gained prominence in the 1990s, especially with the Day Parts albums.

Steamroller developed a full-length theatrical motion picture based on their Christmas albums, but the plans for production fell through. Instead, the following year, they collaborated with Olivia Newton-John for yet another Christmas album called The Christmas Angel: A Family Story, a mostly spoken-word recording scored with previously released material. In 2003 they released a CD titled Halloween.

In addition to their Fresh Aire and Christmas collections, Steamroller has released: an album of Disney music (1999's Mannheim Steamroller Meets the Mouse); an album celebrating American heritage, (2003's American Spirit, which reunited Chip Davis with C.W. McCall and featured a remake of "Convoy"); and an album Yellowstone, mixing prior Davis compositions and a series of classical pieces by Ottorino Respighi and others.

Mannheim Steamroller's An American Christmas is a 12-hour nationally broadcast special radio program of music and narrated stories, heard on over 250 stations across the United States. The program is hosted by the group's founder Chip Davis and is produced and distributed each year by WestStar TalkRadio Network.

In 2008, Chip Davis underwent surgery, which prevented him from touring or performing with the band. Rather than ultimately force the tour to stop while he recovered, Davis opted to hire additional musicians to replace him temporarily. He also decided to create two different lineups of the band, nicknamed the "red" and "green" touring companies.

The group appeared in the 2011 and 2013 Macy's Thanksgiving Day Parade, playing their version of "Deck the Halls."

A new album composed and performed in the design of the Fresh Aire series, Exotic Spaces, was set for release in March 2018. The album features songs that were inspired by famous – and exotic – sites, such as Egypt's pyramids and the Taj Mahal. Instrumentation comes from exotic and ethnic instruments mixed with the drums, harpsichord, and synthesizers. The album was officially released in September 2019, prior to the 2019 Christmas tour.

Discography

Fresh Aire series albums

Christmas albums

Chip Davis – Christmas albums

Halloween albums

Ambience series albums

Chip Davis – Day Parts series and solo albums

Other albums

1 Billboards Top New Age Albums chart became the New Age Albums chart in June 2009.
2 Billboards Top Holiday Albums chart became the Holiday Albums chart in June 2009.

See also
Hooked on Classics
List of ambient music artists
List of best-selling music artists
Trans-Siberian Orchestra

References

External links
 

American classical music groups
Musical groups from Omaha, Nebraska
Musical groups established in 1974